Andy Roddick was the defending champion but lost in the final 6–1, 6–4 against Taylor Dent.

Seeds
A champion seed is indicated in bold text while text in italics indicates the round in which that seed was eliminated.

  Andy Roddick (final)
  Paradorn Srichaphan (second round)
  James Blake (second round)
  Wayne Ferreira (first round)
  Jan-Michael Gambill (second round)
  Todd Martin (first round)
  Nikolay Davydenko (first round)
  Kenneth Carlsen (first round)

Draw

External links
 2003 Kroger St. Jude International Draw

2003 Kroger St. Jude International
Singles